Keron Donavan Williams (1984) is a retired NFL / CFL defensive tackle. He was originally signed by the Calgary Stampeders in 2006. Williams played college football for the UMass Minutemen. He also continued his career with over 10 years as a professional defensive tackle. Keron Williams is the Co-Founder of Gravitt8 Development, a tech company located in Houston, Texas that helps aspiring entrepreneurs and companies shape their brand identities through technology. Keron is a designer, motivational speaker and tenacious entrepreneur, who brings over 10 years’ experience in UI UX Design and Development, Graphic Design and Software Engineering to the leadership of Gravitt8.

Professional career
Keron Williams was signed by the Calgary Stampeders in 2006 and made his professional debut at defensive tackle against the Lions on October 15, 2006. Following two seasons with the Stampeders, he signed as a free agent with the Montreal Alouettes where he won his first Grey Cup championship in 2009. After his championship-winning season, Williams signed with the BC Lions as a free agent on February 16, 2010, and switched to playing defensive end. He won his second Grey Cup championship as a member of the Lions in 2011 after BC won the 99th Grey Cup while beginning the season 0–5. Williams finished the  2012 CFL season as the league leader in sacks with 12, which was also a career high. He then played his last season with the BC Lions and retired from playing professional football in 2014. Williams, an eight-year veteran defensive end in the Canadian Football League who has spent the past four seasons with the B.C. Lions, designed the 102nd Grey Cup Festival brand, the Roar on the Shore, which was unveiled at a press conference in downtown Vancouver on Wednesday. Jamie Pitblado, the general manager for the 2014 Grey Cup at BC Place Stadium, approached Williams with the idea of designing the brand last November, during Grey Cup week in Saskatchewan. Williams is the CEO of Gravitt8 Development located in Houston, TX. Gravitt8 focuses on Mobile Applications, Websites Design & Development, Graphic Designs, AI and UI/UX Design and Research.

Personal info
Keron Williams is married to Ariel N. Williams and has two children Jazmyne and Troy. He currently resides in Houston, Texas after living in Orlando, FL for many years. Keron and his wife Ariel Williams currently work as the Co-Founders of Gravitt8 Development LLC. A tech company located in Houston, TX. Williams currently mentors millennials, high school students, and middle school students and is active in the Houston community and through his impact he won the 2019 Millennial on The Move Award presented by The Mayor of Houston.

References

External links
UMass profile

1984 births
Living people
Calgary Stampeders players
Jamaican players of American football
Montreal Alouettes players
BC Lions players
UMass Minutemen football players